Anastasia Valeryevna Fesikova (born 8 May 1990), née Anastasia Zuyeva, is a Russian swimmer who holds the Russian national records for the 50, 100 and 200 metres backstroke events. She swam for Russia at the 2008 Olympics, the 2012 Olympics and the 2016 Olympics. At the 2012 Olympic Games, she won a silver medal in the 200 m backstroke.

Career

International Swimming League 
In spring 2020, Fesikova signed to the Toronto Titans, the first Canadian based professional swim team, in their inaugural season.

World Championships 
At the 2012 London Olympics, Zueva won a silver medal in 200 m backstroke behind American Missy Franklin.
Zueva competed at the 2007 World Championships taking 7th place in 100 m backstroke, 5th place 4x100 meters medley relay.

European Championships 
Zueva made her debut in the national team of Russia at the 2006 European Championships in Mallorca, Spain. At the 2008 European Championships in Eindhoven, she won gold in 50 m and 100 m backstroke, silver in the 200m backstroke, and silver in the 4 x 100 meters medley relay. Zueva aggravated an old back injury and she was forced to miss the beginning of the 2009 season.

Other 
On 28 April 2009 at the 2009 Russian Championships, Zueva twice swam under the existing world record in the women's long-course 50 m backstroke of 27.67 (held by Australia's Sophie Edington). In prelims of the meet, Zueva clocked a 27.48 to lead qualifying for the final, where she won the event in 27.47. However, on 29 June 2009, FINA announced they were not recognizing either of these two swims by Zueva as the world record. This subsequently became problematic, as Zueva swam a 27.56 at the Monte Carlo meet of the 2009 Mare Nostrum series on 14 June 2009. This time by Zueva was not viewed as a world record at the time of the meet, as it is slower than either time she swam in April at the Russian Championships. However, the time is still faster than Edington's world record time. She swam under the existing world record in 2009 in the women's long-course 50 m backstroke 3 times. However, two of these 3 times have not been approved as the world record, and the third, as of July 2009, is a likely candidate to not be approved as well.

Zueva's time from Monaco now becomes the next candidate for the world record, but reports indicate that this time will also not be approved as the world record as Zueva was not drug tested at the time of the swim because she did not break what was thought to be the world record (and all world record applications must have a cleared drug-test for approval). Zueva also lost-out on a world record prize money bonus from the meet organizers.

Achievements
In March 2008, she set the European records in winning the 50 m and 100 m backstrokes (28.05 and 59.41) at the 2008 European Championships.

At the 2008 Olympics, she set and held the Olympic record in the women's 100 m backstroke (59.61) for a heat during the preliminary rounds of the event.  At the 2012 Olympics, she won her first medal, a silver in the 200 m backstroke.

Personal life
At age 5, Zueva was brought by her mother, Valentina Ivanovna, to the pool. She and her family later moved from Moscow to Penza. She trained in Penza school of Olympic reserve. Her hobbies include hiking and sailing.
In August 2013, Zueva married fellow Russian swimmer Sergey Fesikov and gave birth to her first child in 2014. Zueva (now Fesikova) returned to international competition in 2015 for the 2015 World Championships in Kazan, Russia.

Olympic results
Beijing 2008:
Women's 100 Metres Backstroke Final, 5th
Women's 200 Metres Backstroke Final, 4th
Women's 4 x 100 Metres Medley Relay Final, 5th
London 2012:
Women's 100 Metres Backstroke Final, 4th
Women's 200 Metres Backstroke Final, 2nd
Women's 4 x 100 Metres Medley Relay Final, 4th

See also
World record progression 50 metres backstroke
World record progression 100 metres backstroke

References

External links

Anastasia Zueva bio page 
Anastasia Zueva Sports bio

1990 births
Living people
Swimmers at the 2008 Summer Olympics
Swimmers at the 2012 Summer Olympics
Swimmers at the 2016 Summer Olympics
Olympic swimmers of Russia
World record setters in swimming
World Aquatics Championships medalists in swimming
Russian female backstroke swimmers
Olympic silver medalists for Russia
European Aquatics Championships medalists in swimming
Medalists at the 2012 Summer Olympics
Olympic silver medalists in swimming
People from Voskresensk
Penza State University alumni
Universiade medalists in swimming
Universiade gold medalists for Russia
Medalists at the 2013 Summer Universiade
Swimmers at the 2020 Summer Olympics
Sportspeople from Moscow Oblast
20th-century Russian women
21st-century Russian women